John Mannion (4 June 1907 – 10 September 1978) was an Irish Fine Gael politician from Clifden, County Galway. He was a Teachta Dála (TD) for three years and a senator for 11 years.

A farmer before entering politics, Mannion was elected to Dáil Éireann for the Galway West constituency on his first attempt, at the 1951 general election. He lost the seat at the 1954 general election, and although he stood again at the 1957, 1965 and 1969 general elections, he never returned to the Dáil. After his 1954 defeat, he was elected to the 8th Seanad Éireann by the Agricultural Panel. He was defeated at the 1957 Seanad election, but regained his seat at the 1961 election and held it until he retired at the 1969 Seanad election.

His son, John Mannion Jnr, succeeded him in the Seanad, and also served one term as a TD.

See also
Families in the Oireachtas

References

1907 births
1978 deaths
Fine Gael TDs
Members of the 14th Dáil
Members of the 8th Seanad
Members of the 10th Seanad
Members of the 11th Seanad
Politicians from County Galway
Irish farmers
Fine Gael senators